A Twenty20 International (T20I) is a form of cricket, played between two of the international members of the International Cricket Council (ICC), in which each team faces a maximum of twenty overs. The matches have top-class status and are the highest T20 standard. The game is played under the rules of Twenty20 cricket. The first Twenty20 International match between two men's sides was played on 17 February 2005, involving Australia and New Zealand. Wisden Cricketers' Almanack reported that "neither side took the game especially seriously", and it was noted by ESPNcricinfo that but for a large score for Ricky Ponting, "the concept would have shuddered". However, Ponting himself said "if it does become an international game then I'm sure the novelty won't be there all the time".
This is a list of South Africa Cricket team's Twenty20 International records. It is based on the List of Twenty20 International records, but concentrates solely on records dealing with the South African cricket team. South Africa played their first ever T20I in 2005.

Key
The top five records are listed for each category, except for the team wins, losses, draws and ties, all round records and the partnership records. Tied records for fifth place are also included. Explanations of the general symbols and cricketing terms used in the list are given below. Specific details are provided in each category where appropriate. All records include matches played for South Africa only, and are correct .

Team records

Overall Record

Team wins, losses, draws and ties 
, South Africa has played 151 T20I matches resulting in 87 victories, 62 defeats, 1 tie, and 1 no result for an overall winning percentage of 58.33 .

First bilateral T20I series wins

First T20I match wins

Team scoring records

Most runs in an innings
The highest innings total scored in T20Is has been scored twice. The first occasion came in the match between Afghanistan and Ireland when Afghanistan scored 278/3 in the 2nd T20I of the Ireland series in India in February 2019. The Czech Republic national cricket team against Turkey during the 2019 Continental Cup scored 278/4 to equal the record. The highest score for South Africa is 241/6 scored against England during the England's tour of South Africa in November 2009.

Fewest runs in an innings
The lowest innings total scored was by Turkey against Czech Republic when they were dismissed for 21 during the 2019 Continental Cup. The lowest total in T20I history for South Africa is 87 scored against India in the June 2022, South Africa tour of India.

Most runs conceded an innings
The second match of the T20I Series against West Indies in 2015 saw South Africa concede their highest innings total of 236/6.

Fewest runs conceded in an innings
The lowest score conceded by South Africa for a full inning is 80 when they dismissed Afghanistan during the 2010 ICC World Twenty20 at Kensington Oval, Bridgetown, Barbados.

Most runs aggregate in a match
The highest match aggregate scored in T20Is came in the match between India and West Indies in the first T20I of the August 2016 series at Central Broward Regional Park, Lauderhill when India scored 244/4 in response to West Indies score of 245/6 to loose the match by 1 run. The second match of the T20I Series against West Indies in 2015 saw a total of 467 runs being scored, the most involving South Africa.

Fewest runs aggregate in a match
The lowest match aggregate in T20Is is 57 when Turkey were dismissed for 28 by Luxembourg in the second T20I of the 2019 Continental Cup in Romania in August 2019. The lowest match aggregate in T20I history for South Africa is 118 scored during the first T20I of West Indies tour of South Africa in 2007-08.

Result records
A T20I match is won when one side has scored more runs than the runs scored by the opposing side during their innings. If both sides have completed both their allocated innings and the side that fielded last has the higher aggregate of runs, it is known as a win by runs. This indicates the number of runs that they had scored more than the opposing side. If the side batting last wins the match, it is known as a win by wickets, indicating the number of wickets that were still to fall.

Greatest win margins (by runs)
The greatest winning margin by runs in T20Is was Czech Republic's victory over Turkey by 257 runs in the sixth match of the 2019 Continental Cup. The largest victory recorded by South Africa was during the 2009 ICC World Twenty20 by 130 runs against Scotland.

Greatest win margins (by balls remaining)
The greatest winning margin by balls remaining in T20Is was Austria's victory over Turkey by 104 balls remaining in the ninth match of the 2019 Continental Cup. The largest victory recorded by South Africa is during the Pakistan's tour in 2007 when they won by 10 wickets with 51 balls remaining.

Greatest win margins (by wickets)
A total of 22 matches have ended with chasing team winning by 10 wickets with South Africa winning by such margins a record three times. South Africa have won a T20I match by this margin on two occasions.

Highest successful run chases
Australia holds the record for the highest successful run chase which they achieved when they scored 245/5 in response to New Zealand's 243/6. The highest successful chase by South Africa is 208/2 in the opening match of the 2007 ICC World Twenty20 against West Indies at New Wanderers Stadium, Johannesburg, South Africa.

Narrowest win margins (by runs)
The narrowest run margin victory is by 1 run which has been achieved in 15 T20I's with South Africa winning such games thrice.

Narrowest win margins (by balls remaining)
The narrowest winning margin by balls remaining in T20Is is by winning of the last ball which has been achieved 26 times. South Africa has achieve victory of the last ball once.

Narrowest win margins (by wickets)
The narrowest margin of victory by wickets is 1 wicket which has settled four such T20Is. The narrowest victory by wickets for South Africa is three wickets on four occasions.

Greatest loss margins (by runs)
South Africa's biggest defeat by runs was against Australia in the Australia's tour of South Africa in 2020 at New Wanderers Stadium, Johannesburg, South Africa.

Greatest loss margins (by balls remaining)
The largest defeat suffered by South Africa was against England at Rose Bowl, Southampton, England during the 2017 T20I Series during England tour when they lost by 9 wickets with 33 balls remaining.

Greatest loss margins (by wickets)
South Africa have lost a T20I match by a margin of 9 wickets on one occasion.

Narrowest loss margins (by runs)
The narrowest loss of South Africa in terms of runs is by 1 run suffered twice.

Narrowest loss margins (by balls remaining)
South Africa has suffered a loss off the last ball twice.

Narrowest loss margins (by wickets)
South Africa has suffered defeat by 2 wickets thrice.

Tied matches 
A tie can occur when the scores of both teams are equal at the conclusion of play, provided that the side batting last has completed their innings. 
There have been 19 ties in T20Is history with South Africa involved in one such game. (In this case, a Super Over was used as a tie-breaker and South Africa won.)

Individual records

Batting records

Most career runs
India's Rohit Sharma has scored the most runs in T20Is with 3,737. Second is Virat Kohli of India with 3,712 ahead of Martin Guptill from New Zealand in third with 3,497. Quinton de Kock is the leading South African batsmen on this list.

Most runs in each batting position

Highest individual score
The third T20I of the 2018 Zimbabwe Tri-Nation Series saw Aaron Finch score the highest Individual score. Faf du Plessis holds the South African record.

Highest individual score – progression of record

Highest score against each opponent

Highest career average
A batsman's batting average is the total number of runs they have scored divided by the number of times they have been dismissed.

Highest Average in each batting position

Most half-centuries
A half-century is a score of between 50 and 99 runs. Statistically, once a batsman's score reaches 100, it is no longer considered a half-century but a century.

Virat Kohli of India has scored the most half-centuries in T20Is with 24. He is followed by India's Rohit Sharma on 21, Ireland's Paul Stirling on 18 and Australia's David Warner on 17. Duminy has the most half-centuries for South Africa

Most centuries
A century is a score of 100 or more runs in a single innings.

Rohit Sharma has scored the most centuries in T20Is with 4. Four South African's have one century apiece.

Most Sixes

Most Fours

Highest strike rates
Ravija Sandaruwan of Kuwait holds the record for highest strike rate, with minimum 250 balls faced qualification, with 165.80. Aiden Markram is the South African with the highest strike rate.

Highest strike rates in an inning
Dwayne Smith of West Indies strike rate of 414.28 during his 29 off 7 balls against Bangladesh during 2007 ICC World Twenty20 is the world record for highest strike rate in an innings. Quinton de Kock with his innings of 65 off 22 balls against England in February 2020 during the England's tour of South Africa in 2019-20 holds the top position for a South Africa player in this list.

Most runs in a calendar year
Paul Stirling of Ireland holds the record for most runs scored in a calendar year with 748 runs scored in 2019. Graeme Smith scored 316 runs in 2010, the most for a South Africa batsmen in a year.

Most runs in a series
The 2014 ICC World Twenty20 in Bangladesh saw Virat Kohli set the record for the most runs scored in a single series scoring 319 runs. He is followed by Tillakaratne Dilshan with 317 runs scored in the 2009 ICC World Twenty20. Jacques Kallis has scored the most runs in a series for a South Africa batsmen, when he scored 238 runs in the 2009 ICC World Twenty20.

Most ducks
A duck refers to a batsman being dismissed without scoring a run. 
Tillakaratne Dilshan of Sri Lanka, Pakistan's Umar Akmal and Ireland's Kevin O'Brien has scored the equal highest number of ducks in T20Is with 10 such knocks. JP Duminy with 6 ducks has the highest number of such knocks for South Africa.

Bowling records

Most career wickets 
A bowler takes the wicket of a batsman when the form of dismissal is bowled, caught, leg before wicket, stumped or hit wicket. If the batsman is dismissed by run out, obstructing the field, handling the ball, hitting the ball twice or timed out the bowler does not receive credit.

Shakib Al Hasan, former captain of Bangladesh, is the highest wicket-taker in T20Is. Dale Steyn is the highest ranked South African bowler on the all-time.

Best figures in an innings 
Bowling figures refers to the number of the wickets a bowler has taken and the number of runs conceded.
India's Deepak Chahar holds the world record for best figures in an innings when he took 6/7 against Bangladesh in November 2019 at Nagpur. Ryan McLaren holds the South African record for best bowling figures.

Best figures in an innings – progression of record

Best Bowling Figure against each opponent

Best career average 
A bowler's bowling average is the total number of runs they have conceded divided by the number of wickets they have taken.
Afghanistan's Rashid Khan holds the record for the best career average in T20Is with 12.62. Ajantha Mendis, Sri Lankan cricketer, is second behind Rashid with an overall career average of 14.42 runs per wicket. Imran Tahir with an average of 14.08 is the highest-ranked South African bowler.

Best career economy rate 
A bowler's economy rate is the total number of runs they have conceded divided by the number of overs they have bowled.
New Zealand's Daniel Vettori, holds the T20I record for the best career economy rate with 5.70. Johan Botha, with a rate of 6.38 runs per over conceded over his T20I career, is the highest South African on the list.

Best career strike rate 
A bowler's strike rate is the total number of balls they have bowled divided by the number of wickets they have taken.
With the best T20I career strike rate, the top bowler is Rashid Khan of Afghanistan with 12.3 balls per wicket strike rate. Imran Tahir is the South African bowler with the lowest strike rate.

Most four-wickets (& over) hauls in an innings 
Pakistan's Umar Gul has taken the most four-wickets (or over) among all the bowlers. Imran Tahir has taken the most such hauls among South African bowlers.

Best economy rates in an inning 
The best economy rate in an inning, when a minimum of 12 balls are delivered by the bowler, is Sri Lankan player Nuwan Kulasekara economy of 0.00 during his spell of 0 runs for 1 wicket in 2 overs against the Netherlands at Zohur Ahmed Chowdhury Stadium in the 2014 ICC World Twenty20. Dale Steyn holds the South African record during his spell in 2010 ICC World Twenty20 at Kensington Oval, Bridgetown, Barbados against Afghanistan and by Robin Peterson against New Zealand during the New Zealand cricket team in South Africa in 2012-13.

Best strike rates in an inning 
The best strike rate in an inning, when a minimum of 4 wickets are taken by the player, is by Steve Tikolo of Kenya during his spell of 4/2 in 1.2 overs against Scotland during the 2013 ICC World Twenty20 Qualifier at ICC Academy, Dubai, UAE. Dale Steyn, Morne Morkel and Andile Phehlukwayo have the best strike rate for a South African bowler.

Worst figures in an innings 
The worst figures in a T20I came in the Sri Lanka's tour of Australia when Kasun Rajitha of Sri Lanka had figures of 0/75 off his four overs at Adelaide Oval, Adelaide. The worst figures by a South African is 0/58 that came off the bowling of David Wiese in the 2016 tour by Australia at New Wanderers Stadium, Johannesburg, South Africa.

Most runs conceded in a match 
Kasun Rajitha also holds the dubious distinction of most runs conceded in a T20I during the aforementioned match. Kyle Abbott with figures of 1/68 off his four overs against West Indies in January 2015 holds the most runs conceded distinction for South Africa.

Most wickets in a calendar year 
Australia's Andrew Tye holds the record for most wickets taken in a year when he took 31 wickets in 2018 in 19 T20Is. Tabraiz Shamsi has so far taken 24 wickets in 2021, the most among South African bowlers.

Most wickets in a series 
2019 ICC World Twenty20 Qualifier at UAE saw records set for the most wickets taken by a bowler in a T20I series when Oman's pacer Bilal Khan tool 18 wickets during the series. Imran Tahir in the 2014 ICC World Twenty20 took 12 wickets, the most for a South African bowler in a series.

Hat-trick 
In cricket, a hat-trick occurs when a bowler takes three wickets with consecutive deliveries. The deliveries may be interrupted by an over bowled by another bowler from the other end of the pitch or the other team's innings, but must be three consecutive deliveries by the individual bowler in the same match. Only wickets attributed to the bowler count towards a hat-trick; run outs do not count.
In T20Is history there have been just 13 hat-tricks, the first achieved by Brett Lee for Australia against Bangladesh in 2007 ICC World Twenty20.

Wicket-keeping records
The wicket-keeper is a specialist fielder who stands behind the stumps being guarded by the batsman on strike and is the only member of the fielding side allowed to wear gloves and leg pads.

Most career dismissals 
A wicket-keeper can be credited with the dismissal of a batsman in two ways, caught or stumped. A fair catch is taken when the ball is caught fully within the field of play without it bouncing after the ball has touched the striker's bat or glove holding the bat, Laws 5.6.2.2 and 5.6.2.3 state that the hand or the glove holding the bat shall be regarded as the ball striking or touching the bat while a stumping occurs when the wicket-keeper puts down the wicket while the batsman is out of his ground and not attempting a run.
Quinton de Kock is the highest ranked South African wicket keeper in the all-time list of taking most dismissals in T20Is as a designated wicket-keeper, which is headed by India's MS Dhoni and West Indian Denesh Ramdin.

Most career catches 
Quinton de Kock has taken the most catches in T20Is as a designated wicket-keeper among South Africans with Dhoni and Ramdin leading the all-time list.

Most career stumpings 
Quinton de Kock has made the most stumpings in T20Is as a designated wicket-keeper among South African wicket-keepers with Dhoni and Kamran Akmal of Pakistan heading this all-time list.

Most dismissals in an innings 
Four wicket-keepers on four occasions have taken five dismissals in a single innings in a T20I.

The feat of taking 4 dismissals in an innings has been achieved by 19 wicket-keepers on 26 occasions with Gilchrist being the only Australian wicket-keeper.

Most dismissals in a series 
Netherlands wicket-keeper Scott Edwards holds the T20Is record for the most dismissals taken by a wicket-keeper in a series. He made 13 dismissals during the 2019 ICC World Twenty20 Qualifier. South African record is held by Gilchrist when he made 9 dismissals during the 2007 ICC World Twenty20.

Fielding records

Most career catches 
Caught is one of the nine methods a batsman can be dismissed in cricket. The majority of catches are caught in the slips, located behind the batsman, next to the wicket-keeper, on the off side of the field. Most slip fielders are top order batsmen.

South Africa's David Miller holds the record for the most catches in T20Is by a non-wicket-keeper with 62, followed by Shoaib Malik of Pakistan on 50 and New Zealand's Martin Guptill with 47.

Most catches in an innings 
The feat of taking 4 catches in an innings has been achieved by 14 fielders on 14 occasions with David Miller being the only South African fielder.

Most catches in a series 
The 2019 ICC Men's T20 World Cup Qualifier, which saw Netherlands retain their title, saw the record set for the most catches taken by a non-wicket-keeper in a T20I series. Jersey's Ben Stevens and Namibia's JJ Smit took 10 catches in the series. AB de Villiers with 6 catches in the 2007 ICC World Twenty20 is the leading South African fielder on this list.

Other records

Most career matches 
India's Rohit Sharma holds the record for the most T20I matches played with 129, followed by Shoaib Malik of Pakistan with 124 and Mohammad Hafeez with 119 games. David Miller is the most experienced South African player having represented the team on 100 occasions.

Most consecutive career matches 
Afghanistan's Mohammad Shahzad and Asghar Afghan hold the record for the most consecutive T20I matches played with 58. Duminy holds the South African record.

Most matches as captain 
MS Dhoni, who led the Indian cricket team from 2007 to 2016, holds the record for the most matches played as captain in T20Is with 72. Faf du PLessis has led South Africa in 37 matches, the most for any player from his country.

Most matches won as a captain

Youngest players on Debut 
The youngest player to play in a T20I match is Marian Gherasim at the age of 14 years and 16 days. Making his debut for Romania against the Bulgaria on 16 October 2020 in the first T20I of the 2020 Balkan Cup thus becoming the youngest to play in a men's T20I match.

Oldest Players on Debut 
The Turkish batsmen Osman Göker is the oldest player to make their debut a T20I match. Playing in the 2019 Continental Cup against Romania at Moara Vlasiei Cricket Ground, Moara Vlăsiei he was aged 59 years and 181 days.

Oldest Players 
The Turkish batsmen Osman Göker is the oldest player to appear in a T20I match during the same above mentioned match.

Partnership records
In cricket, two batsmen are always present at the crease batting together in a partnership. This partnership will continue until one of them is dismissed, retires or the innings comes to a close.

Highest partnerships by wicket
A wicket partnership describes the number of runs scored before each wicket falls. The first wicket partnership is between the opening batsmen and continues until the first wicket falls. The second wicket partnership then commences between the not out batsman and the number three batsman. This partnership continues until the second wicket falls. The third wicket partnership then commences between the not out batsman and the new batsman. This continues down to the tenth wicket partnership. When the tenth wicket has fallen, there is no batsman left to partner so the innings is closed.

Highest partnerships by runs
The highest T20I partnership by runs for any wicket is held by the Afghan pairing of Hazratullah Zazai and Usman Ghani who put together an opening wicket partnership of 236 runs during the Ireland v Afghanistan series in India in 2019

Highest overall partnership runs by a pair

Umpiring records

Most matches umpired
An umpire in cricket is a person who officiates the match according to the Laws of Cricket. Two umpires adjudicate the match on the field, whilst a third umpire has access to video replays, and a fourth umpire looks after the match balls and other duties. The records below are only for on-field umpires.

Ahsan Raza of Pakistan holds the record for the most T20I matches umpired with 49. The most experienced Australian umpire is Rod Tucker with 35 matches officiated so far.

See also

List of Twenty20 International records
List of Test cricket records
List of Cricket World Cup records

Notes

References

South African cricket lists
South Africa in international cricket